Dr Ewald Fabian (4 November 1885, in Berlin – 17 February 1944, in New York City) was a socialist Dentist, working in Berlin in the 1930s. He was the editor of Der Sozialistische Arzt (The Socialist Doctor), organiser of Verbandes sozialistischer Aerzte in Deutschland and the Secretary of the  International Socialist Medical Association.

Biography 
Originally a member of the Democratic Union, Fabian became a member of the Social Democratic Party in 1912.

In 1914, when war broke out, he was arrested by an Italian ship in Marseille as an enemy alien with military service while on a Mediterranean voyage. Until 1918 he was interned as a civilian prisoner in Carcassonne and Ajaccio and was then exchanged for illness in Switzerland. There he joined the anti-war movement. In 1919 he returned to Berlin, where he became a member of Spartacists, the USPD and the KPD. In 1926 he was expelled from the KPD. Later he joined the KPD-O. On November 23, 1931 he resigned as a founding member of the SAP at. From 1925 to 1933 he was secretary of the Association of Socialist Doctors and editor of the journal The Socialist Doctor.

After the Nazi seizure of power, Fabian was listed as an enemy of the state and arrested. He was set free with a bail from his sister and moved to Prague. With the Germany invasion of Czechoslovakia, Fabian fled to Paris, and eventually New York, where he lived until his death in 1944.

Works and legacy 
He is credited by Charles Brook with inspiring the formation of the Socialist Medical Association (later the Socialist Health Association) which played a prominent part in establishing the British National Health Service. He corresponded with and eventually met Dr Brook in 1930.  Brook explains that  Fabian was a man of heavy  build  and when he got in his fragile car, which was contemptuously referred to by his friends as “The Dung Cart,” the front passenger seat collapsed. The SMA later helped him by securing his release from a French internment camp at the beginning of the Second World War.

References

1885 births
1944 deaths
German dentists
20th-century dentists
German emigrants to the United States